Hope is a Canadian short drama film, directed by Pedro Pires and released in 2011. Inspired by Marie Brassard's theatrical play Jimmy, créature de rêve, the film depicts a military general (Bill Croft) reflecting on his life as he lays dying on a battlefield.

The film premiered at the 2011 Toronto International Film Festival. It was subsequently screened in Montreal as the opening film for selected screenings of Lars von Trier's film Melancholia.

The film was named to TIFF's annual year-end Canada's Top Ten list for 2011. It was a Genie Award nominee for Best Live Action Short Drama at the 32nd Genie Awards, and a Prix Jutra nominee for Best Short Film at the 14th Jutra Awards.

References

External links
 

Films directed by Pedro Pires
Canadian drama short films
2010s Canadian films